Tammy T. Phelps is an American politician serving as a member of the Louisiana House of Representatives from the 3rd district. She assumed office on January 13, 2020.

Education 
After graduating from Captain Shreve High School, Phillips earned a Bachelor of Science degree in business administration from Louisiana Tech University and a Master of Business Administration in strategic leadership from Amberton University.

Career 
Outside of politics, Phillips works as an education administrator. She was elected to the Louisiana House of Representatives in November 2019 and assumed office on January 13, 2020.

References 

Living people
Democratic Party members of the Louisiana House of Representatives
Women state legislators in Louisiana
Louisiana Tech University alumni
Amberton University alumni
African-American state legislators in Louisiana
Year of birth missing (living people)